Trinity High School is the name of high schools:

United Kingdom
Trinity High School, Renfrew, Renfrewshire, Scotland
Trinity High School, Rutherglen, Lanarkshire, Scotland
Trinity High School and Sixth Form Centre, in Redditch, England
Trinity Church of England High School, in Manchester, England

United States
Trinity School (Athens, Alabama), closed 1970 in the wake of desegregation 
Trinity High School (Weaverville, California)
Trinity Catholic High School (Connecticut)
Trinity High School (River Forest, Illinois)
Trinity Catholic High School (Kansas)
Trinity High School (Louisville), Kentucky
Trinity High School (Whitesville, Kentucky)
Trinity Catholic High School (St. Louis), Missouri
Trinity High School (Manchester, New Hampshire)
Trinity High School (Trinity, North Carolina)
Trinity High School (Dickinson, North Dakota)
Trinity High School (Garfield Heights, Ohio)
Trinity High School (Camp Hill, Pennsylvania)
Trinity High School (Washington, Pennsylvania)
Trinity High School (Euless, Texas)
Trinity High School in Trinity Independent School District, Texas
Trinity Christian School (Morgantown, West Virginia)

See also
Trinity School (disambiguation)
Trinity College (disambiguation)
Trinity Christian High School (disambiguation)
Trinity Episcopal School (disambiguation)